Silvestre Diaz Campusano (born December 31, 1965) is a Dominican former professional baseball center fielder, who played in Major League Baseball (MLB) for the Toronto Blue Jays and Philadelphia Phillies, and in the Chinese Professional Baseball League (CPBL) for the Wei Chuan Dragons. Campusano batted and threw right-handed.

Early life
Campusano grew up in the Santo Domingo suburb of Manoguayabo, along with Ramón Martínez and Juan Guzmán; together, they paved the pathway for MLB Hall of Famer Pedro Martínez to play for the Dominican Professional Baseball League (LIDOM) Tigres del Licey.

Playing career

Major league baseball
He was ranked as one of Baseball America's top prospects, from 1986 to 1988.

Campusano‘s MLB debut was with the Blue Jays, in the  season. He played 79 games (G), with 142 at bats (AB), 31 hits (H), 14 runs scored (R), 2 home runs (HR), and 12 runs batted in (RBI). Campusano was relegated to playing the entire  season for the Blue Jays’ Triple-A Minor League Baseball (MiLB) affiliate in Syracuse.

Then, on December 4, 1989, Campusano was drafted by the Philadelphia Phillies in the 1989 Rule 5 draft. His entire  season was spent with the Philadelphia MLB squad, where he posted 18 H, in 85 AB, 66 G, with 2 HR (again), and 9 RBI. Returning for a second year with the Phillies, he played mostly for their AAA minor-league team, the Scranton/Wilkes-Barre Red Barons. That season was to be Campusano’s last in the big leagues, with only 15 MLB game appearances.

For Phillies fans, Campusano is perhaps best remembered as a light-hitting reserve player, who broke up Pittsburgh Pirate Doug Drabek's no-hitter, on August 3, 1990. Campusano said of the event that he did not feel nervous or any pressure going into the at bat.

Dominican winter league
Campusano played for Tigres del Licey, in the Dominican Republic, for 11 years, going undefeated in winning the 1991 Caribbean Series title, while also capturing the 1994 Caribbean Series championship. He led the league in doubles (1991–1992) and runs (1992–1993). In 1993–1994, he was the league leader in runs, home runs, and walks, batted for the cycle (in the final series), and was named Most Valuable Player (MVP).

Taiwan leagues and aftermath
After leaving MLB, Campusano enjoyed a prosperous career in CPBL. While playing for the Wei Chuan Dragons (–), he won the 1994 HR championship. Campusano also played for the Chiayi-Tainan Luka (–), winning the 1997 Taiwan Major League title.

References

External links

1965 births
Chiayi-Tainan Luka players
Diablos Rojos del México players
Dominican Republic expatriate baseball players in Canada
Dominican Republic expatriate baseball players in Mexico
Dominican Republic expatriate baseball players in Taiwan
Dominican Republic expatriate baseball players in the United States
Florence Blue Jays players
Gulf Coast Blue Jays players
Knoxville Blue Jays players
Langosteros de Cancún players
Living people
Major League Baseball outfielders
Major League Baseball players from the Dominican Republic
Mexican League baseball left fielders
Mexican League baseball right fielders
People from Santo Domingo
Philadelphia Phillies players
Saraperos de Saltillo players
Scranton/Wilkes-Barre Red Barons players
Syracuse Chiefs players
Toronto Blue Jays players
Wei Chuan Dragons players